Altar Q is the designation given to one of the most notable of the rectangular sculpted stone blocks (dubbed "altars") recovered at the Mesoamerican archaeological site of Copán, present-day Honduras.

Copán was a major Maya civilization center during the Classic period of Mesoamerican chronology, and Altar Q records a dynastic lineage for the Copán-based polity in the Maya script. It was created during the rule of King Yax Pac (also known as Yax Pasaj Chan Yoaat) in 776. Each of the sixteen leaders of Copan are shown with a full body portrait, four on each side of the monument. It starts with Yax K'uk' Mo', who ruled starting in 426 AD, and extends through 763 AD, ending with Yax Pasaj Chan Yoaat.
Therefore, the monument's depictions span three hundred and fifty years of time. Each ruler is seated on a glyph that represents his name, except for the dynastic founder Yax K'uk' Mo', who is seated on the glyph for "lord", and whose name is given in his headdress. Yax Kuk Mo is shown handing down the insignia of reign to Yax Pac. This was a form of propaganda, intended to show that Yax Pac was just as worthy of rule as the first leader.

The name Altar Q was given by Alfred P. Maudslay who conducted the first archeological exploration of the site in 1886. At that time the altar was located at the bottom of the staircase in Structure 16, the central pyramid in Copán's acropolis. It has subsequently been moved to the Copán Sculpture Museum.

Inscription
According to David Stuart:

According to Linda Manzanilla:

See also
Copán Bench Panel

Literature 
 Gerd Sdouz: Altar Q – Copan, Honduras. Verlag Berger, Horn/Vienna 2015. . (bilingual [German/English]; summarizes the latest research about Altar Q, including a review of the as yet lost records from Juan Galindo, the first researcher who extensively documented the Maya site in 1834.

References

External links 
 Altar Q facts
 QuickTime video of all sides of Altar Q
 3D model of Altar Q

8th-century establishments in North America
8th-century inscriptions
1886 archaeological discoveries
Religious buildings and structures completed in 776
Mesoamerican stone sculpture
Maya inscriptions
Copán
King lists
Altars